Karen Tam (born 1977) is a Canadian artist and curator who focuses on the constructions and imaginations of cultures and communities through installations in which she recreates Chinese restaurants, karaoke lounges, opium dens, curio shops and other sites of cultural encounters. She is based in Montreal, Quebec.

Education 
Tam holds a BFA in Studio Arts and Music from Concordia University and an MFA in Sculpture from the School of the Art Institute of Chicago and a PhD in Cultural Studies from Goldsmiths (University of London).

Exhibitions 
Tam's work has been exhibited nationally and internationally in galleries such as the Ormeau Baths Gallery (Belfast), Irish Museum of Modern Art (Dublin), Betty Rymers Gallery and 11th Street Gallery/Columbia College (Chicago), Foster-Tanner Gallery (Tallahassee, Florida), YVZ Artists' Outlet (Toronto), Khyber Centre for the Arts (Halifax), and MAI - Montréal arts interculturels (Montreal).

Awards 
Karen Tam's video Plum Sauce won the Audience Choice Award at the 2002 Asian American Film Festival in Chicago.  She was a finalist for the Prix Louis-Comtois in 2017 from the Contemporary Art Galleries Association and the Ville de Montréal, a finalist for the Prix en art actuel from the Musée national des beaux-arts de Québec in 2016, and long-listed for the Sobey Art Award in 2010 and 2016. She was awarded the 2021 Giverny Capital Prize by collector François Rochon, president of the private portfolio management firm Giverny Capital.

List of major exhibitions

Selected solo exhibitions 

Swallowing Mountains (February - August 2023), McCord Stewart Museum.
Karen Tam: With Wings Like Clouds Hung from the Sky 大鵬就振翼 (February - April 2022), Varley Art Gallery (Markham, ON) (Curated by Anik Glaude)
Les illusions sont réelles (February 19 - April 24, 2022), Musée national des beaux-arts du Québec Manif d'art 10, La Bienale de Québec (Curated by Steven Matijcio)
Autumn Tigers (Online) (October 2021 - Ongoing), Art Canada Institute in partnership with Campbell River Art Gallery (Curated by Jenelle M. Pasiechnik)
the chrysanthemum has opened twelve times (January 2020), Koffler Centre of the Arts (Toronto, Canada)
with wings like clouds hung from the sky  (May 2019), Richmond Art Gallery (Richmond, BC, Canada)
 (Travelling Exhibition) Nous sommes tous les brigands/We Are All Robbers, EXPRESSION (2017-2019), Centre d’exposition de Saint-Hyacinthe (Saint-Hyacinthe, Canada); Musées Régionale de Rimouski, (Rimouski, Canada); Musées des beaux-arts de Sherbrooke (Sherbrooke, Canada); Plein sud, centre en art actuel de Longueuil (Longueuil, Canada)
 Souvenirs from the Jasmine Café, SIGHTINGS (2017), Leonard & Bina Ellen Gallery, Concordia University (Montréal, Canada)
 SHEEN-wah-ZREE (2016), Musée d’art contemporain des Laurentides (Saint-Jérôme, Canada)
 Des mimes et des mites (2016), Conseil des arts de Montréal (Montréal, Canada)
 Silk Road: Storm-Detectors, Blood-Sweating Horses, & Constellations (2016), Galerie Hugues Charbonneau (Montréal, Canada)
 Terra dos Chinês Curio Shop (2016), Articule (Montréal, Canada)
 Made in Britain (2015), Galerie Hugues Charbonneau (Montréal, Canada)
 Terra dos Chinês Curio Shop (2015), Artspace Peterborough (Peterborough, Canada)
 Sinography (2013), QueenSpecific (Toronto, Canada) (Curators: Stefan Hancherow and Jen Simaitis)
 Opium Den (2011), Robert Langen Gallery, Wilfrid Laurier University (Waterloo, Canada)
 Pagoda Pads, Art Gallery of Greater Victoria (Victoria, Canada) (Curator: Lisa Baldissera)
 (Traveling exhibition) Gold Mountain Restaurant: No MSG At Friendship Dinner (Or Cats) (2006-08). Art Gallery of Southwestern Manitoba; Shangri-la Café: YYZ Artists’ Outlet (Toronto); Old Silver Moon: Forest City Gallery (London, ON); House of Wong: Artcite (Windsor); On Rock Garden: AKA Gallery (Saskatoon); Orientally Yours, Southern Alberta Art Gallery (Lethbridge, Canada) 
 Gold Mountain Restaurant Montagne d’Or (2004), Montréal, arts interculturels (MAI) (Montréal, Canada)
 Real-Life Heroes Who Make A Difference (2004), Irish Museum of Modern Art (Dublin, Ireland)

Selected group exhibitions 

 Secret Chord : An Ode to Montreal (2023)
 Le je et le nous — The I and the We, (2019) MAI (Montréal, arts interculturels) (Montréal, Canada) (Curator: Zoë Chan)
 Connections and Reconnections (2018-2019), Montréal Museum of Fine Arts (Montréal, Canada)
 Ici Londres/London Calling (2018-2019), Musée de la civilisation (Québec City, Canada) 
 Here/Elsewhere: The Sample of Overseas Chinese Art (2018), He Xiangning Art Museum (Shenzhen, China) (Curator: Wang Huangsheng)
 mmmmm…Gendai Kitchen (2017), Gendai Gallery (Toronto, Canada)
 Far and Near: the Distance(s) between Us, Art Museum/Justina M. Barnicke Gallery, University of Toronto (Toronto, Canada) (Curator: Henry Lu) 
 Power Ball XVIII: Pleasure Principle (2016), Power Plant Toronto, Canada)
 Tracing Asian Canadian Art Histories and Aesthetic Alliances (2015), Artexte (Montréal, Canada)
 Convoluted Beauty: In the Company of Emily Carr (2014), The Mendel Art Gallery (Saskatoon, Canada) (Curator: Lisa Baldissera)
 Couriers of Taste (2013), Danson House (Bexley, UK) (Curators: Day+Gluckman)
 Sinopticon: Contemporary Chinoiserie (2012-2014), Victoria & Albert Museum (London, UK), Plymouth Arts Centre, Saltram House National Trust, Plymouth City Museum & Art Gallery (Plymouth, UK) (Curator: Eliza Gluckman)
 Location/Dislocation (2011), J.M. Barnicke Gallery/Jackman Humanities Institute, University of Toronto
 East Goes East (2011), Third Space/Tiers Espace (Saint John, Canada) (Curator: Chris Lloyd)
 BGL/Pascal Grandmaison/Adad Hannah/Karen Tam (2010), Musée d’art contemporain de Montréal
 Rien ne se perd, rien ne se crée, Musée d’art contemporain (Montréal, Canada)
 Rearranging Desires, FOFA Gallery, Concordia University (Montréal, Canada)
 Redress Express, Centre A (Vancouver, Canada) (Curator: Alice Ming Wai Jim)

Selected curatorial works 

 Whose Chinatown? (2021), Griffins Art Project (Vancouver, BC)

Publications 

 Luke, Suzanne and Finn, Jonathan and Kuruvilla, Sunil. Karen Tam : Pagoda Pads : Opium Den.Waterloo, Ont.: Robert Langen Art Gallery, 2011.
 Belu, Françoise and Blouin, Marcel and Lee, Day. Gold Mountain Restaurant = Restaurant Montagne d'or : Karen Tam. Montréal, Qc: MAI (Montréal arts interculturels), 2006.
 Jim, Alice Ming Wai Nolte, Victoria Zhang, Tianmo Harringa, Charissa Von Larose, Delphine Joachim, Joana Harkness, Tamara Lakhrissi, Tarek Montpetit, Gabrielle Colombo, Cindy Wexler, Samamtha (2015). EAHR @ Artexte : Uncovering Asian Canadian and Black Canadian Artistic Production. Ethnocultural Art Histories Research Group (EAHR). .
 Baldissera, Lisa and Despret, Vinciane and Dyke, Erika. Convoluted Beauty : In the Company of Emily Carr. Saskatoon, Sask.: Mendel Art Gallery, 2014.
 
 Rien ne se perd, rien ne se crée, tout se transforme. Bélisle, Josée., Musée d'art contemporain de Montréal. Montréal: Musée d'art contemporain de Montréal. 2008. . .

References 

Women installation artists
Canadian installation artists
1977 births
Living people
School of the Art Institute of Chicago alumni
Concordia University alumni
Alumni of Goldsmiths, University of London
20th-century Canadian women artists
21st-century Canadian women artists
Canadian expatriates in England
Canadian expatriates in the United States
Canadian women curators